Javier "Javi" Alonso Bello (born 1 August 1998) is a Spanish footballer who plays for CD Tenerife as a central midfielder.

Club career
Born in Adeje, Santa Cruz de Tenerife, Canary Islands, Alonso represented EMF Adeje, CD Águilas San Aquilino and CD Tenerife as a youth. He made his debut as a senior with the reserves on 23 April 2017, playing the last 23 minutes in a 1–1 Tercera División home draw against Arucas CF.

Alonso scored his first senior goal on 3 December 2017, netting his team's third in a 7–1 home routing of CD El Cotillo. He made his first team debut on 17 November of the following year, coming on as a late substitute for Iker Undabarrena in a 0–2 away loss against CA Osasuna in the Segunda División.

On 17 February 2021, Alonso renewed his contract until 2025. In July, however, he suffered a knee injury which kept him out of action for six months.

References

External links

1998 births
Living people
People from Tenerife
Sportspeople from the Province of Santa Cruz de Tenerife
Spanish footballers
Footballers from the Canary Islands
Association football midfielders
Segunda División players
Tercera División players
CD Tenerife B players
CD Tenerife players